Sympistis augustus is a species of moth in the family Noctuidae (the owlet moths).

The MONA or Hodges number for Sympistis augustus is 10096.

References

Further reading

 
 
 

augustus
Articles created by Qbugbot
Moths described in 1875